Rômulo José Cardoso da Cruz (born 8 February 2002), known as Rômulo Cardoso or just Rômulo, is a Brazilian footballer who plays as a forward for Athletico Paranaense.

Club career

Born in Marialva, Paraná, Rômulo joined Athletico Paranaense's youth setup in 2018, on loan from Maringá. In July 2019, he was bought outright by the club.

Rômulo made his first team – and Série A – debut on 16 November 2021, coming on as a second-half substitute for Pedro Rocha in a 0–1 home loss against Atlético Mineiro. He scored his first senior goal on 23 January 2022, netting a last-minute winner in a 1–0 Campeonato Paranaense home win over Paraná.

On 19 February 2022, Rômulo scored a hat-trick in a 5–1 home routing of Cianorte.

Career statistics

Honours
Athletico Paranaense
 Copa Sudamericana: 2021

References

External links
Athletico Paranaense profile 

2002 births
Living people
Sportspeople from Paraná (state)
Brazilian footballers
Association football forwards
Campeonato Brasileiro Série A players
Campeonato Paranaense players
Club Athletico Paranaense players